Franz Ludwig Freiherr von Erthal (16 September 1730 in Lohr am Main - 14 February 1795 in Würzburg) was the prince-bishop of Würzburg and Bamberg from 1779 until his death.  He was buried at the Würzburg Cathedral (#45 diagram). 

From 1779 until his death, he was very prudent as the prince-bishop of Bamberg and Würzburg in personal union. He was permeated with the ideas of the Enlightenment and promoted the education of the clergy. In Bamberg, he built the first modern hospital and introduced a first public social insurance. The University of Bamberg received a chair for veterinary medicine under its government. Politically, he was loyal to the house of Habsburg and close to Emperor Joseph II. Unlike his predecessor Adam Friedrich von Seinsheim, Erthal was no friend of profane pleasures, and there were no hunts and opera performances at his court. The Würzburg Residenz was however completed during his reign.

External links
 Catholic Encyclopedia

1730 births
1795 deaths
People from Lohr am Main
People from the Electorate of Mainz
Prince-Bishops of Bamberg
Prince-Bishops of Würzburg
Barons of Germany
18th-century Roman Catholic bishops in Bavaria
Burials at Würzburg Cathedral
Dukes of Franconia